Hougang is a planning area and mature residential town located in the North-East Region of Singapore. The town is the most populous in the region, being home to 247,528 residents as of 2018. Hougang planning area is bordered by Sengkang to the north, Geylang and Serangoon to the south, Bedok to the southeast, Toa Payoh to the southwest, Paya Lebar to the east, Ang Mo Kio to the west and Bishan to the southwest.

Subzones
Hougang is separated into 10 subzones, Hougang East, Defu Industrial Park, Tai Seng, Lorong Halus, Kangkar, Hougang West, Trafalgar, Lorong Ah soo, Kovan and Hougang Central.

Etymology and history
Hougang is the pinyin version of Aū-káng, a Hokkien and Teochew name meaning "river end", as Hougang is located upstream or at the back of Sungei Serangoon. In the past, the name connoted the area stretching from the fifth milestone junction of Upper Serangoon Road and Upper Paya Lebar Road/Boundary Road to the seventh and a half milestone junction of Upper Serangoon Road and Punggol Road.  The area just beyond the seventh milestone along Punggol Road was formerly considered part of Punggol but is now within Hougang Town and that section of Punggol Road is now Hougang Avenue 8, with Punggol Road starting further north.

Pig farming was carried out in Punggol, including the area of Punggol that is now part of Hougang Town. The last of these pig farmers were relocated by the late-1990s to flats built in Hougang.  Today, Hougang is an HDB new town with over 40,000 housing units interspersed with pockets of private residential areas.

There was also a fishing port at the end of Upper Serangoon Road beyond the seventh milestone.

At Hougang Street 21, there was a well that is still identified as the tua jia kha (大井腳) well structure. This well identified the Teochew village of tua jia kha which means the "foot of a big well". In the past, the village was a popular place for food, street wayangs, itinerant Chinese medicine men and story tellers spinning yarns.

Hougang has been developed since 1977 with the construction of Tampines Way. Further development has been made for the development of new neighbourhoods in Neighbourhood 1 – 3 by 1983, Neighbourhood 4 – 7 by 1992. Neighbourhood 8 is the town centre of the Hougang, completed in 1994. Neighbourhood 9 has been in the recent and has been completed by 2000.

In 2015, project named Hougang Capeview, a Build-To-Order project at Upper Serangoon Road, is the first public housing project to receive the CONQUAS Star, an accolade administered by the Building and Construction Authority. Hougang Capeview, which comprises 781 residential units in six blocks at Upper Serangoon Road, received a Construction Quality Assessment System (CONQUAS) score of more than 95, above the national average of 88.2. The CONQUAS score is BCA’s measure of construction quality across Singapore.

Shopping

Hougang has 8 shopping malls which are

 Hougang Mall, a seven-storey shopping mall with an NTUC FairPrice outlet, Singtel outlet, Starhub outlet, and Popular bookstore. The mall serves the residents of Hougang Central.
 Hougang Green Shopping Mall, a four-storey shopping mall with a 24/7 Giant outlet. The mall serves Hougang West.
 The Midtown, a mixed development with a condominium and a cluster of shops in Hougang Central.
 Hougang 1, a suburban mall with an NTUC FairPrice Xtra outlet in Hougang West.
 Heartland Mall, a suburban mall in Kovan. It has a Cold Storage outlet and Popular bookstore.
 Kang Kar Mall, a two-storey shopping centre which has a Kang Kar Food Court and a two-storey NTUC FairPrice outlet.
 Upper Serangoon Shopping Centre, a suburban mall that has a cluster of shops, it serves residents of Kovan.
 Buangkok Square Shopping Mall, a mixed development shopping mall in Buangkok with condominiums and a three-storey shopping mall with McDonald's, and a Prime Supermarket.

Transport

Bus Interchange

Hougang Central Bus Interchange

Hougang Central Bus Interchange is a bus interchange serving the town of Hougang. It is located directly above Hougang MRT station. By 2030, Hougang Central Bus Interchange would be majorly renovated to accommodate the Cross Island Line section, and would become an Integrated Transport Hub in 2030.

Bus Depots

Hougang Bus Depot

Hougang Bus Depot is an SBS Transit West District bus depot located in Hougang, Singapore. As of November 2014, the total fleet is 600 buses. Hougang Bus Depot started operations in 1983 when the north-east which is Hougang and Serangoon was developed and previously, all operations had been on Ang Mo Kio Bus Depot and Bedok Bus Depot respectively.

Mass Rapid Transit stations

Hougang MRT station

Hougang MRT station is an underground Mass Rapid Transit (MRT) station on the North East line and Cross Island line in the Hougang planning area in Singapore. Located within the Hougang Town Centre, the station is directly connected to Hougang Central Bus Interchange. This station will become an interchange station along the Cross Island line when the Cross Island line stage 1 opens in 2030.

Kovan MRT station

Kovan MRT station is an underground Mass Rapid Transit (MRT) station on the North East line in Hougang planning area. With the opening of Kovan station, the former Hougang South Bus Interchange subsequently ceased operations in February 2004 and its services were transferred to Hougang Central Bus Interchange located next to Hougang MRT station.

Tai Seng MRT station

Tai Seng MRT station is an underground Mass Rapid Transit (MRT) station on the Circle line, situated on the boundary of Hougang planning area. Located along Upper Paya Lebar Road, Tai Seng station was named after and primarily serves the industrial clusters at Tai Seng, which in turn means 'big accomplishment' in Chinese. The name was first used on a rubber factory constructed in the area in 1917.

Defu MRT station

Defu MRT station is a future underground Mass Rapid Transit station on the Cross Island MRT line in Hougang planning area, Singapore. It will serve the Defu Industrial Park.

Serangoon North MRT station

Serangoon North MRT station is a future underground Mass Rapid Transit station on the Cross Island MRT line located on the boundary of Hougang planning area in Singapore.

Mass Rapid Transit Depots

Kim Chuan Depot

Kim Chuan Depot is a train depot for the Mass Rapid Transit system in Singapore. The depot is constructed fully underground and provides maintenance, stabling and operational facilities for the Circle Line. It is located in Hougang, along Upper Paya Lebar Road, and is accessible via Kim Chuan Road. It used to be the first depot in Singapore to serve two independently operated MRT lines, until the adjacent Tai Seng Facility Building, became operational with the revenue operation of the Downtown Line Stage 3 on 21 October 2017.

Tai Seng Facility Building

Tai Seng Facility Building, abbreviated as TSFB, (or Tai Seng) is an underground train depot for the Mass Rapid Transit system in Singapore. The depot is constructed towards the east of Kim Chuan Depot and will provide maintenance, stabling and operational facilities for the Downtown Line. It is located in Hougang along Bartley Road East. It is accessible via a surface building located along Bartley Road East. The depot is approximately 52 metres wide, 295 metres long and 20 metres deep. It is connected to Kim Chuan Depot and has underground access for trains to run between both facilities, allowing Downtown Line trains to be stabled in the Tai Seng Facility Building, and able to access its remote tracks. It is used in tandem with Kim Chuan Depot for the operations of the Downtown Line.

Road networks
Two of the oldest main roads; Upper Serangoon Road & Punggol Road runs through Hougang since the town's beginning. The town is also linked to other towns by Yio Chu Kang Road in the West, Tampines Road in the East, Upper Paya Lebar Road to the south-East, Buangkok Drive & Buangkok Green in the North.

The other roads in Hougang New Town links the town to bigger roads, most importantly Avenue 2, 3 which links the town from East and West.

Amenities

Most of Hougang's commercial activity is centred on a few shopping malls such as Hougang Mall, Kang Kar Mall, Heartland Mall, Upper Serangoon Shopping Centre and Hougang 1 (Formerly known as Hougang Point, and opened in End 1999).

Similar to most other residential towns in Singapore, Hougang was designed to be a partially self-sufficient with enough amenities to minimize the number of residents commuting to the Central Area. Facilities include Hougang Sports Hall, an indoor sports complex operated by Sport Singapore which runs ClubFITT membership and sports programmes, Hougang stadium home to S.League club Hougang United, an aquatics centre, a number of parks such as Punggol Park, along with many wet markets and hawker centres.

One of the more prominent landmarks in Hougang is the Buangkok Green Medical Park, which houses several medical facilities including the Institute of Mental Health (IMH) and Singapore Leprosy Relief Association (SILRA).

The Hougang Central Bus Interchange serves Hougang Town with a range of bus services going to other parts of the island. It is located in Hougang Central, near Hougang Mall and it has an underground link to Hougang MRT station. This bus interchange was officially opened on 17 February 1995 by former cabinet minister Goh Chee Wee, who was then Senior Minister of State for Communications, Trade and Industry to serve all buses around the Hougang Area. Its sister bus interchange, Hougang South Bus Interchange (that is near to Kovan MRT station) ceased operations in 2004 and was converted to Kovan Hub.

Two even older bus terminals operated in Hougang before the construction of the Hougang Central and Hougang South Bus Interchanges. One was at the end of Upper Serangoon Road in Kangkar Village, which was replaced by Hougang Central, while the other was at the sixth and a half milestone of Upper Serangoon Road, which was replaced by Hougang South.

Highlights

A distinctive feature of Hougang lies in the large semi-circular balconies which occur in many Housing and Development Board public housing flats in the area. This feature is not as prevalent in public housing outside Hougang. The latest addition of new Condominium will be Florence Residences in 2019.

Politics
The political representation of Hougang was split into four different constituencies as of the 2020 elections, three of which were Group Representation Constituencies (GRC) (Aljunied, Ang Mo Kio, and Marine Parade), and one Single Member Constituency (SMC) bearing the same name, the Hougang Single Member Constituency. Currently, Aljunied and Hougang wards are managed by the opposition Workers' Party (WP), while Ang Mo Kio and Marine Parade are managed by the ruling People's Action Party (PAP). Previously, Hougang was administered by five now-defunct wards (Jalan Kayu, Paya Lebar, Punggol, Serangoon Gardens and Upper Serangoon), before it redistricted into GRCs, notably Cheng San GRC (also defunct since 2001).

Hougang SMC 

The area covering Hougang Avenues 2, 5, 7 and a small portion of Hougang Central, falls under the namesake Hougang SMC, where it was carved out from Punggol ward ahead of the 1988 elections. The first Member of Parliament (MP) of the ward was PAP's Tang Guan Seng, until it had been captured by former WP secretary-general Low Thia Khiang in 1991. Low left the ward to contest (and later elect himself in) Aljunied GRC ahead of the 2011 elections, and was replaced by Yaw Shin Leong, another WP candidate who previously contested Ang Mo Kio GRC in the 2006 elections. Yaw remained as an MP until his expulsion from the party's CEC and resigned his seat in February 2012 over an extramarital affair. Png Eng Huat, a candidate whose part of the WP team contested East Coast GRC in the 2011 elections, had since represented this ward after winning his by-election in May 2012 until he stepped down ahead of the 2020 election. Dennis Tan, who previously contested Fengshan SMC in the 2015 elections (now part of East Coast GRC) and become a Non-constituency Member of Parliament (NCMP), has replaced outgoing Png following the election.

Aljunied GRC 

The area covering south of Hougang Avenues 6, 8, 10, as well as Punggol Park, Defu Industrial Park and the subregion of Kovan, falls under Aljunied GRC. The western portions of Hougang, previously being Serangoon Gardens division, were split into two divisions with Jalan Kayu in the Ang Mo Kio GRC and Serangoon in the Aljunied GRC. The area was previously belong to the short-lived Thomson GRC in 1991.

The GRC was not contested in 2001 with the WP being disqualified due to incomplete applications, but in the 2006 elections, the WP were able to pose a strong challenge for this ward, with the members consist of WP's chairwoman Sylvia Lim and former members Goh Meng Seng (now the secretary-general of People's Power Party) and James Gomez.

The GRC was managed by the PAP which members include Cynthia Phua and Foreign Minister George Yeo, until it became the first opposition held GRC since the creation of the GRC in Singapore after the 2011 Singaporean general election being taken over by Low Thia Khiang's WP team. The WP continued to hold the GRC in the 2015 and 2020 Singaporean general elections with Leon Perera and Gerald Giam replacing Low and Chen Show Mao.

Ang Mo Kio GRC 

The north-western portions of Hougang (Avenues 4, 8 and 9, and Street 91), which includes Hougang Stadium and Regentville Condo, falls under the Ang Mo Kio-Hougang division of the Ang Mo Kio GRC. Its MP is Darryl David, who replaces former MP Yeo Guat Kwang after the 2015 elections. Prior to the 2011 elections, the ward was a part of Aljunied GRC (under the name of Aljunied-Hougang), where Yeo was then the MP.

The northern portions of Hougang (north of Avenues 6, 8 and Street 51) also falls under the Ang Mo Kio-Hougang division, part of Ang Mo Kio GRC. It previously belonged to Pasir Ris-Punggol GRC (under the name of Punggol South) until it was carved out in 2015. After the 2020 elections, the portion was merged with the Ang Mo Kio-Hougang division.

The western portions of Hougang, previously being Serangoon Gardens division, were split into two divisions with Jalan Kayu in the Ang Mo Kio GRC and Serangoon in the Aljunied GRC.

Marine Parade GRC 

The southernmost portion of Hougang, Tai Seng, was under the Geylang Serai division of Marine Parade GRC, where Mohd Fahmi Aliman represented the ward. Marine Parade was also contested by WP during the 2015 and 2020 elections.

Education
The area has a total of nine primary schools, eight secondary schools and one junior college, Anderson Serangoon Junior College (ASRJC). ASRJC was formed after the merger of Anderson Junior College and Serangoon Junior College in 2019.

See also
Hougang Tou Mu Kung Temple

References

Sources
Victor R Savage, Brenda S A Yeoh (2003), Toponymics – A Study of Singapore Street Names, Eastern Universities Press, 
 The Florence Residences

 
Places in Singapore
North-East Region, Singapore